Gregorius is a 2004 novel by Swedish author Bengt Ohlsson. It won the August Prize in 2004.

References

2004 Swedish novels
Swedish-language novels
August Prize-winning works
Novels set in Stockholm
Albert Bonniers Förlag books